!!! is a dance-punk band formed in 1996.

!!! may also refer to:

 !!! (album), the debut album by the band !!!
 A tour cassette produced by the band !!!
 Exclamation mark emphasis form by triplication

See also
 !! (disambiguation)
 ! (disambiguation)